The Avenue Fonsny (French) or Fonsnylaan (Dutch) is a major street in the Saint-Gilles municipality of Brussels, Belgium, connecting the / on the south-west of the Small Ring to the municipality of Forest. It is continued in Forest by the Avenue Van Volxem/Van Volxemlaan. It runs parallel to the Belgian railway line 96. One entry to Brussels-South railway station is on the Avenue Fonsny.

See also

 List of streets in Brussels

Fonsny
Saint-Gilles, Belgium